Jefferson station is a Jacksonville Skyway monorail station in Jacksonville, Florida. It is located on Bay Street just west of Jefferson Street in Downtown Jacksonville.

History 
The Jefferson station was one of three original Jacksonville Skyway stations that opened in June 1989 on the initial  Phase I-A segment. It stands between LaVilla station to the west and Central station to the east on the initial  Phase I-A segment. All three stations were closed between December 1996 and December 1997, when the Skyway system switched from Matra to Bombardier Transportation technology. JTA closed the station between July 5, 2017 and May 4, 2020 for the construction of an adjacent apartment complex and for the conversion of the Convention Center station to the Jacksonville Regional Transportation Center at LaVilla.

References

External links 
 entrance from Google Maps Street View

Jacksonville Skyway stations
Railway stations in the United States opened in 1989
1989 establishments in Florida